The Distelhäuser Brewery (German: Distelhäuser Brauerei) is a medium-sized brewery in Distelhausen, a district of Tauberbischofsheim in the Tauber valley, in Tauber Franconia, Germany.

History

The brewery was founded in 1811 as Brewery Womann and acquired in 1876 by Ernst Bauer. The annual production is about 185,000 hectolitres (as at: May 2015). The raw materials used are traditionally mainly from the region of Tauber Franconia. Distelhäuser Beer is brewed in accordance with the German purity law (Reinheitsgebot) of 1516, and the brewery is a founding member of the Die Freien Brauer (Independent Brewers) initiative, an association of medium-sized private breweries in Germany and Austria. As early as 1956 the brewery involved its staff in various forms in the profits.

On the brewery grounds in Distelhausen is the restaurant of Distelhäuser Brauhaus, the butcher's shop Farmer's snack (Bauers Brotzeit) and the convention centre Old bottling hall (Alte Füllerei).

Since 2001 the Distelhäuser Brewery has operated in a service centre in Erlenbach in the district of Heilbronn in Baden-Württemberg in southern Germany to improve its logistics.

The Distelhäuser brewery is a sponsor of Slow Food Germany. Between the years 2004 and 2012 in the grounds of the brewery in cooperation with Slow Food the Distelhäuser gourmet market (Distelhäuser Genießermarkt) took place.

Honours
The Distelhäuser Brewery is one of the most successful breweries in Germany measured by the number of awards for its products. The following awards have been earned by the brewery and the products (point of time: May 2015):

Brewery awards
 In 2009, the Distelhäuser Brewery won the "Brewery of the Year" prize awarded by the German Agricultural Society (DLG).
 In 2014, the Distelhäuser Brewery won the DLG "Brewery of the Year" prize again.

Beer awards
Distelhäuser Pils (German-Style Pilsener)
 World Beer Cup: 2002 Gold
 European Beer Star: 2006 Silver, 2008 Silver
 Internat. DLG-Qualitätswettbewerb: 2006 Silver, 2007 Gold, 2009 Gold, 2010 Gold, 2011 Gold, 2012 Gold, 2013 Silver, 2014 Gold, 2015 Gold
Alkoholfreies (Alcohol-free German-Style Pilsener).
 Internat. DLG-Qualitätswettbewerb: 2014 Gold, 2015 Silver 
Leichtes (German-Style Leichtbier/Lightweightbeer)
 World Beer Cup: 2010 Silver
 European Beer Star: 2006 Gold
 Internationaler DLG-Qualitätswettbewerb: 2007 Bronze, 2008 Silver, 2012 Bronze, 2013 Silver
Hefe-Weizen (South German-Style Hefeweizen/Hefeweissbier/Naturally cloudy yeast wheat)
 Internationaler DLG-Qualitätswettbewerb: 2006 Gold, 2007 Gold, 2008 Gold, 2009 Gold, 2010 Gold, 2011 Gold, 2012 Gold, 2013 Gold, 2014 Gold, 2015 Gold
Hefe-Weizen alkoholfrei (Alcohol-free South German-Style Hefeweizen/Hefeweissbier/Isotonic yeast wheat)
 Internationaler DLG-Qualitätswettbewerb: 2011 Gold, 2013 Silver, 2014 Gold, 2015 Gold
Kristall-Weizen (Clear crystal wheat)
 World Beer Cup: 2008 Gold, 2010 Bronze
 European Beer Star: 2008 Gold, 2009 Silver
 Internationaler DLG-Qualitätswettbewerb: 2009 Gold, 2010 Silver, 2011 Gold, 2012 Silver, 2013 Silver
Dunkles Hefe-Weizen (South German-Style Dunkel Weizen/Dunkel Weissbier/Spicy dark yeast wheat)
 World Beer Cup: 2002 Silver, 2004 Silver, 2006 Gold, 2010 Bronze
 European Beer Star: 2005 Gold, 2006 Silver
 Internationaler DLG-Qualitätswettbewerb: 2006 Gold, 2007 Gold, 2008 Gold, 2009 Gold, 2010 Gold, 2011 Gold, 2012 Gold, 2013 Gold, 2014 Gold, 2015 Gold
Dinkel
 European Beer Star: 2007 Silver, 2008 Silver, 2009 Silver, 2011 Gold, 2012 Bronze, 2014 Gold
 Internationaler DLG-Qualitätswettbewerb: 2009 Gold, 2010 Gold, 2011 Gold, 2012 Gold, 2013 Gold, 2014 Gold, 2015 Gold
Kellerbier (Cellar Beer)
 Internat. DLG-Qualitätswettbewerb: 2014 Gold, 2015 Gold 
Landbier (European-Style Dark)
 World Beer Cup: 2006 Silver
 European Beer Star: 2013 Bronze
 Internationaler DLG-Qualitätswettbewerb: 2006 Gold, 2007 Gold, 2008 Gold, 2009 Gold, 2010 Gold, 2011 Gold, 2012 Silver, 2013 Silver, 2014 Gold, 2015 Gold
Märzen (German-Style Märzen)
 Internationaler DLG-Qualitätswettbewerb: 2006 Gold, 2007 Gold, 2008 Silver, 2009 Gold, 2010 Silver, 2011 Gold, 2012 Gold, 2013 Gold, 2014 Gold, 2015 Silver
Export (European-Style Export)
 World Beer Cup: 2004 Bronze
 European Beer Star: 2004 Silver
 Internationaler DLG-Qualitätswettbewerb: 2006 Gold, 2007 Gold, 2008 Silver, 2009 Gold, 2010 Gold, 2011 Gold, 2012 Silver, 2013 Gold, 2014 Gold, 2015 Gold
Malz (Non-Alcoholic Malt Tonic)
 World Beer Cup: 2006 Gold
 Internationaler DLG-Qualitätswettbewerb: 2006 Gold, 2007 Gold, 2008 Gold, 2009 Gold, 2010 Gold, 2011 Gold, 2012 Gold, 2013 Gold, 2014 Gold, 2015 Gold
Frühlingsbock (German-Style Heller Bock/Maibock/Bright Spring-Bock)
 World Beer Cup: 2010 Gold
Distel Spezial
 Internationaler DLG-Qualitätswettbewerb: 2012 Gold, 2013 Gold, 2015 Gold
Distel Blond
 European Beer Star: 2013 Silver 
 Internat. DLG-Qualitätswettbewerb: 2014 Gold, 2015 Gold 
Black Pearl Classic Porter
 Meiningers international CraftBeer Award: 2014 Silver, 2015 Gold
Loch Ness Classic Stout
 Meiningers international CraftBeer Award: 2014 Gold, 2015 Silver
Lucky Hop IPA
 Silver Meiningers international CraftBeer Award 2014

External links

 www.distelhaeuser.com (Website in English)
 www.distelhaeuser.de (Website in German)

References

Beer in Germany
Breweries in Baden-Württemberg
Companies based in Baden-Württemberg
German companies established in 1811
Food and drink companies established in 1811